The Silyap Range is a mountain range in the Sakha Republic (Yakutia), Far Eastern Federal District, Russia. The nearest city is Ust-Nera.

Geography
The Silyap Range rises in the central area of the Chersky Range, to the west of the upper course of the Indigirka. Although the range is one of the smallest of the system, it has some of the most massive mountains of the range.

The larger Borong Range, another subrange of the Chersky Mountains, rises to the northwest, and the Porozhny Range to the north. The northern end of the Tas-Kystabyt rises roughly 70 km to the south of the range.

See also
List of mountains and hills of Russia
List of ultras of Northeast Asia

References

External links
Поход 1958 года. Хребет Силяпский (горная страна Черского)- Hiking in 1958 in the Silyap Range (in Russian)
Collecting localities in the upper course of Indigirka River near Ust-Nera Settlement
Landscapes as a reflection of the toponyms of Yakutia
Ranges of Russia

Mountain ranges of the Sakha Republic
Chersky Range